The Tuscan regional election of 1980 took place on 8 June 1980.

Electoral law 
Election was held under proportional representation with provincial constituencies where the largest remainder method with a Droop quota was used. To ensure more proportionality, remained votes and seats were transferred at regional level and calculated at-large.

Results
The Italian Communist Party was by far the largest party. After the election Mario Leone (Italian Socialist Party), the incumbent President of the Region, formed a new government with the Italian Communist Party.

In 1983 a government crisis occurred as the relationship between the Communists and the Socialists had become tense at the national level. Communist Gianfranco Bartolini formed a one-party government and then a new coalition government with the Proletarian Unity Party.

Source: Ministry of the Interior

References

1980 elections in Italy
1980 regional election
1980
June 1980 events in Europe